Martina Navratilova was the defending champion but lost in the final 6–2, 6–4 against Steffi Graf.

Seeds
A champion seed is indicated in bold text while text in italics indicates the round in which that seed was eliminated.

  Steffi Graf (champion)
  Martina Navratilova (final)
  Gabriela Sabatini (second round)
  Jana Novotná (second round)
  Kimiko Date (first round)
  Manuela Maleeva-Fragniere (semifinals)
  Helena Suková (first round)
  Nathalie Tauziat (second round)

Draw

External links
 1994 Toray Pan Pacific Open Draw

Pan Pacific Open
Toray Pan Pacific Open - Singles
1994 Toray Pan Pacific Open